Jacob Hagiz (1620–1674) was a Jewish Talmudist born of a Sephardi Jewish family at Fes, Morocco. Ḥagiz's teacher was David Karigal who afterward became his father-in-law. In about 1646, Ḥagiz went to Italy for the purpose of publishing his books, and remained there until after 1656, supporting himself by teaching. Samuel di Pam, rabbi at Livorno, calls himself a pupil of Ḥagiz. About 1657, Ḥagiz left Livorno for Jerusalem, where the Vega brothers of Livorno had founded a beit midrash for him, and where he became a member of the rabbinical college. There a large number of eager young students gathered about him, among whom were Moses ibn Ḥabib, who became his son-in-law, and Joseph Almosnino, later rabbi of Belgrade. Another son-in-law of his was Moses Ḥayyun, father of Nehemiah Hayyun.

Jacob Ḥagiz was active in the opposition to Sabbatai Zevi and put him under the ban.

About 1673, Ḥagiz went to Constantinople to publish his Leḥem ha-Panim, but he died there before this was accomplished. This book, as well as many others of his, was lost. He also wrote:
 Teḥillat Ḥokhmah, on Talmudic methodology, published together with Samson of Chinon's Sefer Keritot (Verona, 1647;    Amsterdam, 1709; Warsaw 1884 (without Sefer Keritot))
 Oraḥ Mishor, on the conduct of rabbis (an appendix to the preceding work; 2d ed., with additions by Moses Ḥagiz, Amsterdam, 1709)
 Petil Tekhelet, on the Azharot of Solomon Gabirol (Venice, 1652; 2d ed., London, 1714)
 Eẓ ha-Ḥayyim, on the Mishnah (Livorno, 1654–55; 2d ed., Berlin, 1716)
 Ḥagiz also translated the Menorat ha-Ma'or of Isaac Aboab into Spanish (1656)

References

 Its bibliography:
 Grätz, Gesch. x.212 et seq., and note 3

1620 births
1674 deaths
17th-century rabbis from the Ottoman Empire
Sephardi rabbis in Ottoman Palestine
People from Fez, Morocco
Authors of books on Jewish law